The yellow-crowned elaenia (Myiopagis flavivertex) is a species of bird in the family Tyrannidae, the tyrant flycatchers.
It is found in eastern Orinoco Basin Venezuela, the Guianas, and along the Amazon River corridor; also Colombia, Brazil, Guyana, Suriname, French Guiana, Ecuador and Peru.

Yellow-crowned elaenia is found in the Amazon Basin along the major river course of the Amazon, also the outlet of the adjacent Tocantins River, then after an interruption in the range along the Amazon River, it is along Amazon drainages from eastern Peru, and Ecuador along the river corridors. It also ranges northeastwards into the Guyanas, avoiding the Guiana Shield, from the Amazon River outlet to the Atlantic. The other disjunct population of the species is to the northwest on the eastern portion of the Orinoco River drainage, going from Venezuela into the extreme northeast Colombia border region.

Its natural habitat is subtropical or tropical swamps.

References

External links
Yellow-crowned Elaenia photo gallery VIREO Photo-High Res

yellow-crowned elaenia
Birds of Venezuela
Birds of the Guianas
Birds of the Amazon Basin
Birds of the Ecuadorian Amazon
Birds of the Peruvian Amazon
yellow-crowned elaenia
yellow-crowned elaenia
Birds of Brazil
Taxonomy articles created by Polbot